Uchhali , is a village and one of the 51 Union Councils (administrative subdivisions) of Khushab District in the Punjab Province of Pakistan.   The Union Council included the Uchhali Wetlands Complex located at 72°14'E, 32° 29'N which has been the focus of conservation activities.

References

Union councils of Khushab District
Populated places in Khushab District